An explorer is a person involved in exploration; see also list of explorers.

Explore, explorer, exploring or exploration may also refer to:

Aircraft and spacecraft
 Abrams P-1 Explorer, American aerial survey aircraft which first flew in 1937
 Explorer 1, the 1st United States satellite 
 Explorers Program, the United States' first successful attempt to launch an artificial satellite
 Lockheed Explorer, Lockheed Corporation Model 4 airplane
 MD Helicopters MD Explorer, popular police helicopter
 P&M Explorer, a British ultralight trike design
 Space Adventures Explorer, concept tourist spaceplane
 Space Shuttle Explorer, a mock-up of the US space shuttle, renamed Independence
 Explorer, an Armstrong Whitworth Ensign aircraft

Art, entertainment, and media

Literature
 Explorer (novel), a 2002 novel set in C. J. Cherryh's Foreigner universe
 The Explorers (collection), a collection of short stories by C. M. Kornbluth

Music
 The Explorers, a British rock group formed in the 1980s by two members of Roxy Music
 Explore!, 2015 Indonesian music album by Isyana Sarasvati
 Explorer (album), 2005 trance music album by Tilt
 "Explorers" (song), a 2012 song by Muse from The 2nd Law
 The Explorer (album),a 1996 album by E-Type

Periodicals
 explore (magazine), a Canadian travel magazine
 Explorer (newspaper), newspaper published in Tucson, Arizona
 Explore: The Journal of Science & Healing (established 2005), American journal
 The Explorer (Hudson), student newspaper from Hudson, Ohio, USA

Television
 "Explorers" (Star Trek: Deep Space Nine), an episode of Star Trek: Deep Space Nine
 Explore (TV series), 1980s PBS television show
 Exploring (TV series), 1960s children's educational television show, hosted by Albert Hibbs
 National Geographic Explorer, a documentary television series on the National Geographic Channel

Film
 Explorers (film), 1985 science fiction film
 The Explorer (film), a 1915 American adventure silent film
 Explorer (film), 2022 documentary film about explorer Sir Ranulph Fiennes

Other uses
 Exploration (video game), 1994 computer strategy game for the Amiga

Brands and enterprises
 Explore Scientific, a manufacturer of telescopes, microscopes & binoculars
 Explore Technologies, a toy manufacturer
 Explorer Vodka, Swedish brand of vodka
 Ford Explorer, a model of sport utility vehicle
 Gibson Explorer, a model of guitar also marked as X-plorer and Explorer Pro

Computing
 Exploration problem, the use of a robot to maximize the knowledge over a particular area
 Explore2fs, a Windows Explorer-like program for Microsoft Windows
 Explorer/85, expandable learning system by Netronics based on the 8085 microprocessor
 Microsoft Explorer (disambiguation), products from Microsoft called Explorer
 File Explorer, the interface for accessing the file system on Microsoft Windows operating systems, replacing the earlier File Manager
 Internet Explorer, a web browser developed by Microsoft, originating from Spyglass Mosaic
 Windows Explorer, the desktop environment program for the Windows shell of Windows OSes
 Sun Microsystems Explorer, diagnostic data collection tool for the Sun Solaris operating system
 TI Explorer, a computer family of Lisp Machines from Texas Instruments

Education and youth activities
 Explore (education), a Canadian government bursary for language education
 Explore Learning, a British company founded to provide private learning centres
 Explorer Scouts (The Scout Association), part of the Scout Association in the United Kingdom
 Exploring (Learning for Life), a program of Learning for Life (a Boy Scouts of America affiliate)
 Kansas Explorer's Club, a section of the Kansas Sampler Foundation dedicated to exploring Kansas

Industry
 Mineral exploration, process by which useful ore is located
 Oil exploration, process of locating exploitable petroleum deposits

Maritime and other vessels
 Explorer (sternwheeler), an 1857 purpose built steamboat used by Joseph Christmas Ives' expedition to explore the Colorado River above Fort Yuma
 , the name of two ships of the British Royal Navy
 HSC Stena Explorer, a high-speed ferry operated by Stena Line
 , a cruise ship renamed 
 , a cruise ship
 , a cruise ship
 , a number of ships with this name, including:
 , a cruise ship which sank off the coast of Antarctica in 2007
 , a Bahamas-flagged passenger ship in service since 2004
 , a steam trawler
 Sub Marine Explorer, an 1865 early submarine built by Julius H. Kroehl
 USC&GS Explorer, two ships of the United States Coast and Geodetic Survey
 USC&GS Explorer (1904), a survey ship that briefly served as the USS Explorer during World War I
 USC&GS Explorer (OSS 28), a 1939 survey ship that operated in the Pacific Ocean mostly and saw service there during World War II
  (GSF Explorer), a deep-sea recovery or drilling ship
 Explorer, also known as Discoverer, crossed the Atlantic to North America in 1603 under Martin Pring

Places
 Explorer Peak, mountain in Utah, US
 Explorer Ridge, mid-ocean ridge on the coast of British Columbia, Canada
 Explorer Seamount, seamount in the Pacific Ocean

Sports
 Bradenton Explorers, U.S. Senior Professional Baseball Association team
 Kansas City Explorers, World TeamTennis team
 La Salle Explorers, La Salle University's 23 varsity sports teams
 Sioux City Explorers, a minor league baseball team

Other uses
 Dental explorer, an instrument used in dentistry
 Arctic exploration, the exploration of the Arctic region
 Cave exploration, the recreational pastime of exploring cave systems.
 Desert exploration, the scientific exploration of deserts
 Mineral exploration, the search for commercially viable concentrations of minerals to mine.
 Ocean exploration, the exploration of ocean surfaces
 Reconnaissance, the military observation of enemy activities
 Space exploration, the exploration of outer space
 Urban exploration, the exploration of usually hidden or abandoned buildings and structures

See also 

 Expedition (disambiguation)
 The Explorers (disambiguation)
 Explorer One (disambiguation)